The 8th Syracuse Grand Prix was a motor race, run to Formula One rules, held on 13 April 1958 at Syracuse Circuit, Sicily. The race was run over 60 laps of the circuit, and was won by Italian driver Luigi Musso in a Ferrari Dino 246, who also took pole position and fastest lap.

Results

References 

Syracuse Grand Prix
Syracuse Grand Prix
Syracuse Grand Prix
Syracuse Grand Prix